Racial antisemitism is prejudice against Jews based on a belief or assertion that Jews constitute a distinct race that has inherent traits or characteristics that appear in some way abhorrent or inherently inferior or otherwise different from the traits or characteristics of the rest of a society. The abhorrence may find expression in the form of discrimination, stereotypes or caricatures. Racial antisemitism may present Jews, as a group, as a threat in some way to the values or safety of a society. Racial antisemitism can seem deeper-rooted than religious antisemitism, because for religious antisemites conversion of Jews remains an option and once converted the "Jew" is gone. In the context of racial antisemitism Jews cannot get rid of their Jewishness.

The premise of racial antisemitism is that Jews constitute a distinct racial or ethnic group which negatively impacts gentiles. Racial antisemitism differs from religious antisemitism, which involves prejudice against Jews and Judaism on the basis of their religion. According to William Nichols, one can distinguish historical religious antisemitism from "the new secular antisemitism" based on racial or ethnic grounds: "The dividing line was the possibility of effective conversion ... a Jew ceased to be a Jew upon baptism." However, with racial antisemitism: Now the assimilated Jew was still a Jew, even after baptism ... From the Enlightenment onward, it is no longer possible to draw clear lines of distinction between religious and racial forms of hostility towards Jews... Once Jews have been emancipated and secular thinking makes its appearance, without leaving behind the old Christian hostility towards Jews, the new term antisemitism becomes almost unavoidable, even before explicitly racist doctrines appear.

In the context of the Industrial Revolution, with the emancipation of the Jews (1790s onwards) and the Haskalah (the Jewish Enlightenment of the 18th and 19th centuries), many Jews rapidly urbanized and experienced a period of greater social mobility. With the decreasing role of religion in public life and the simultaneous tempering of religious antisemitism, a combination of growing nationalism, the rise of eugenics, resentment of the perceived socio-economic success of Jews, and the influx of Ashkenazi Jews from Eastern Europe to Central Europe, soon led to the newer, and often more virulent, racist antisemitism.

Scientific racism, the ideology that genetics played a role in group behavior and characteristics, was highly respected and accepted as factual between 1870 and 1940.  Historian Walter Lacquer lists numerous influential figures such as economist Eugen Duehring, composer Richard Wagner, Biblical scholar Paul de Lagarde, and historian-philosophers like Houston Stewart Chamberlain as important figures in the rise of racial antisemitism.  This acceptance of race science made it possible for antisemites to clothe their hatred of Jews in "scientific theory" and propose grand, sweeping political solutions in coming decades, from relocation to Madagascar to compulsory sterilization to mass extermination.

In the Third Reich (1933–1945), Nazis extended the logic of racial antisemitism, enshrining racial antisemitic ideas into laws which assessed the "blood" or ethnicity of people (rather than their current religious affiliations), and prescribing—purely on that basis—the subsequent fate of those so assessed. When added to its views on Jewish racial traits which Nazi pseudoscience devised, the logic of racial antisemitism led to the Holocaust of 1941–1945 as an attempt to eradicate conjured-up "Jewish traits" from the world.

Limpieza de sangre
Racial antisemitism has existed alongside religious antisemitism since at least the Middle Ages, if not longer.

All Jews and people of Jewish ancestry were barred from public office and universities and many other professions, for centuries after there were no Jews left on the Iberian peninsula.

In Spain even before the Edict of Expulsion of 1492, Spanish Jews who converted to Catholicism (conversos in Spanish), and their descendants, were called New Christians. They were frequently accused of lapsing back to their former religious practices (being "Crypto-Jews"). To isolate conversos, the Spanish nobility developed an ideology called "cleanliness of blood".

The conversos were called "New Christians" in order to indicate their inferior status within society. That ideology was a form of racism, because in the past, there were no grades of Christianity and converts to Christianity had equal standing with life-long Christians. Cleanliness of blood was an issue of ancestry, not an issue of personal religion. The first statute of purity of blood appeared in Toledo in 1449, where an anti-converso riot lead to conversos being banned from most official positions. Initially these statutes were condemned by both the monarchy and the Church. However, the New Christians were later hounded and persecuted by the Spanish Inquisition after 1478, the Portuguese Inquisition after 1536, the Peruvian Inquisition after 1570 and the Mexican Inquisition after 1571, as well as the Inquisition in Colombia after 1610.

Concept of a "Semitic race"

In Medieval Europe, all Asian peoples were thought of as being the descendants of Shem. By the 19th century, the term Semitic was confined to the ethnic groups which have historically spoken Semitic languages or had origins in the Fertile Crescent, as the Jews in Europe did. These peoples were often considered to be a distinct race. However, some antisemitic racial theorists of the time argued that the Semitic peoples arose from the blurring of distinctions between previously separate races. This supposed process was referred to as semiticization by the race-theorist Arthur de Gobineau.

Gobineau himself did not consider the Semites (descendants of Shem) to be a lesser race.  He divided people into three races: white, black, and yellow.  The Semites, like the Aryans (and Hamites) came from Asia and were white. Over time, each of the groups had mixed with black blood.  The Aryans had stayed pure for a longer period of time and it was not until more recent times that they had mixed.  It was this mixing of the races that would lead to man's downfall.  This idea of racial "confusion" was taken up by the Nazi ideologue Alfred Rosenberg. It was used by the Nazis to perpetuate the idea that the Jews were going to destroy Germany.

The term semiticization was first used by Gobineau to label the blurring of racial distinctions that, in his view, had occurred in the Middle East. Gobineau had created an essentialist model of race which was based on the three distinct racial groups, but he did not give a clear account of how this division arose. When these races mixed, they caused their "degeneration". Since the place where these three supposed races first met each other was located in the Middle East, Gobineau theorized that their mixing and dilution also occurred there, and he also theorized that Semitic peoples embodied this "confused" racial identity.

This concept suited the interests of antisemites, since it provided a theoretical model for the rationalization of racialised antisemitism. Variations of this theory were espoused in the writings of many antisemites in the late 19th century. The Nazi ideologue Alfred Rosenberg developed a variant of this theory in his writings, arguing that Jewish people were not a "real" race. According to Rosenberg, their evolution resulted from the mixing of pre-existing races rather than natural selection. The theory of semiticization was typically associated with other longstanding racist fears about the dilution of racial differences through miscegenation, which were manifested in negative images of mulattos and negative images of members of other mixed groups.

Rise 

Modern European antisemitism has its origins in 19th century theories—now mostly considered as pseudo-scientific, but then accepted as credible—that said that the Semitic peoples, including the Jews, are entirely different from the Aryan, or Indo-European, populations, and that they would not be able to assimilate. These theories may in fact extend even further back in time to Martin Luther's 1543 treatise, On the Jew and Their Lies, in which he writes that Jews are a "base, whoring people, that is, no people of God, and their boast of lineage, circumcision, and law must be accounted as filth". Though many argue that Luther expressed prejudice against Judaism as a religion, not Jews as a race, Franklin Sherman, editor of the American Edition of Luther's Works, writes that “Luther's writings against the Jews…are not ‘merely a set of cool, calm and collected theological judgments. His writings are full of rage, and indeed hatred, against an identifiable human group, not just against a religious point of view.” On the Jews and Their Lies was popular among supporters of the Nazi party during the early 20th century.

Hannah Arendt explains that before the 1870s, the Jewish population was a defined and dethatched group amongst western society. They were given rights and civil liberties for as long as they served the state in which they lived in. However, due to their apolitical standing, they became a target and were visible to the public eye in their position in state finance.

In the view of racial antisemitism, Jews are not opposed on account of their religion, but on account of their supposed hereditary or genetic racial characteristics: greed, a special aptitude for money-making, aversion to hard work, clannishness and obtrusiveness, lack of social tact, low cunning, and especially lack of patriotism. Later, Nazi propaganda also dwelt on supposed physical differences, such as the shape of the "Jewish nose".

Racial antisemitic legislation

In Nazi Germany, the Nuremberg Race Laws of 1935 placed severe restrictions on "aliens" such as Jews or anyone of Jewish heritage.  These laws deprived Jews of citizenship rights and prohibited sexual relations and marriage between any Aryan and Jew (such relations under Nazi ideology was a crime punishable under the race laws as Rassenschande or "racial pollution").  These laws established that on the basis of their race, all Jews, even quarter- and half-Jews, were no longer citizens of their own country (their official title became "subject of the state"). This meant that they had no basic citizens' rights, e.g., to vote. In 1936, Jews were banned from all professional jobs, effectively preventing them having any influence in politics, higher education and industry. On 15 November 1938, Jewish children were banned from going to normal schools. By April 1939, nearly all Jewish companies had either been confiscated, collapsed under financial pressure and declining profits, or had been persuaded to sell out to the Nazi government. This further reduced their human rights; they were legally reduced to second-class compared to the non-Jewish populace.

Racial antisemitic laws legislation was also passed elsewhere. In the 19th century, King Frederick II of Prussia enacted multiple laws harmful against Jewish people of the time such as laws restricting marriage between them. In Austria, laws also fell upon the limit of children Jewish families can have with the law only allowing one child per family as to prevent rise in Jewish population.

Notes

References
 Jewish encyclopedia, Anti-Semitism.
 Bodansky, Yossef. Islamic Anti-Semitism as a Political Instrument. Freeman Center For Strategic Studies, 1999.
 Carr, Steven Alan. Hollywood and anti-Semitism: A cultural history up to World War II. Cambridge University Press, 2001.
 Chanes, Jerome A. Antisemitism: A Reference Handbook. ABC-CLIO, 2004.
 Cohn, Norman. Warrant for Genocide. Eyre & Spottiswoode 1967; Serif, 1996.
 Ehrenreich, Eric. The Nazi Ancestral Proof: Genealogy, Racial Science, and the Final Solution.  Indiana University Press, 2007.
 Freudmann, Lillian C. Antisemitism in the New Testament. University Press of America, 1994.
 Hilberg, Raul. The Destruction of the European Jews. Holmes & Meier, 1985. 3 volumes.
 Lipstadt, Deborah. Denying the Holocaust: The Growing Assault on Truth and Memory. Penguin, 1994.
 McKain, Mark. Anti-Semitism: At Issue. Greenhaven Press, 2005.
 Prager, Dennis, Telushkin, Joseph. Why the Jews? The Reason for Antisemitism. Touchstone (reprint), 1985.
 Selzer, Michael (ed). "Kike!": A Documentary History of Anti-Semitism in America. New York, 1972.
 Steinweis, Alan E. Studying the Jew: Scholarly Antisemitism in Nazi Germany. Harvard University Press, 2006. .

Further reading
 "Why the Jews? History of anti-Semitism"
 Coordination Forum for Countering Antisemitism (with up to date calendar of antisemitism today)
 Annotated bibliography of anti-Semitism hosted by the Hebrew University of Jerusalem's Center for the Study of Antisemitism (SICSA)
 "Anti-Semitism and responses"
 The Stephen Roth Institute for the Study of Contemporary anti-Semitism and Racism hosted by the Tel Aviv University – (includes an annual report)
 "Jews, the End of the Vertical Alliance, and Contemporary Antisemitism"
 "The Anti-Semitic Disease - an analysis of Anti-Semitism" by Paul Johnson in Commentary
 Council of Europe, ECRI Country-by-Country Reports
 "State University of New York at Buffalo, The Jedwabne Tragedy"
 "Jews in Poland today"
 "Anti-Defamation League's report on International Anti-Semitism"
 Judeophobia: A short course on the history of anti-Semitism at Zionism and Israel Information Center.
 If Not Together, How?: Research by April Rosenblum to develop a working definition of antisemitism, and related teaching tools about antisemitism, for activists.
Vintage Postcards with an Anti-Jewish theme
 United States Holocaust Memorial Museum: Antisemitism
 2,000 Year Timeline of Jewish Persecution